QVC Beauty is a digital television shopping channel broadcast in the United Kingdom, specializing in beauty products. It is the sister channel to QVC. The channel launched on Tuesday 26 October 2010 and is available on Freeview, Sky, Freesat and online.

History
QVC Beauty began as a red button stream in 2008, previously called the Beauty Channel, which was only available through QVC Active. On 23 July 2010, the Sky EPG slot for Blueberry TV was acquired from Blueberry TV Ltd. and transferred to QVC, who renamed it Bilberry TV. QVC renamed their existing Ofcom television broadcast license for QVC Beauty as Bilberry TV.

On 4 May 2011, QVC Beauty was launched on Freeview channel 48. On 26 March 2012, the channel moved to Freeview channel 35. On 4 November 2020, the channel moved to channel 36 as part of a move up where every channel from channel 24 to 54 on the platform moved up one place to allow BBC Four to move to channel 24 in Scotland due to new Ofcom rules regarding certain PSB channels requiring greater prominence on EPGs.

References

External links
 

Shopping networks in the United Kingdom
Television channels and stations established in 2010
Beauty organisations
Beauty